Alex Kidd in Shinobi World is a side-scrolling action game from Sega for the Master System in 1990. Developed in Japan, it was released for the overseas market (North America, Europe and Brazil). The game stars Alex Kidd in a parody version of Sega's ninja-themed action game Shinobi, where Alex Kidd fights against caricatures of many of the enemies from Shinobi. It was re-released for the Wii Virtual Console in 2009.

Gameplay

Despite being part of the Alex Kidd series, the game mechanics of Shinobi World are different from Alex Kidd in Miracle World and are much closer to the Master System version of Shinobi.  Alex Kidd's basic attack is a sword slice, which can be used not only to destroy enemies but also to open treasure chests. Inside such chests, the player can obtain items such as more health, throwing darts, a powered-up sword, extra lives, and a magic ball that will temporarily turn Alex Kidd into an invincible tornado. The throwing darts and powered-up sword will both replace the Alex's default sword until the player completes the stage, defeats a boss or loses a life. Other actions that Alex Kidd can perform include a wall-to-wall jump and the ability to turn into a flying fireball after spinning around a street post, a rope or a horizontal bar.

Alex starts off each round with three hit points but can fill out his health gauge to a maximum of six hit points. When the player has full health, all the treasure chests carrying hearts will carry extra lives in their place. When the player defeats a boss with full health, they will gain a "Perfect Bonus" after completing the round. There is also a "Secret Bonus" if the player completes an entire round without getting hit or losing life at any point.

Plot
An evil being known as Hanzo the Dark Ninja escapes after 10,000 years of confinement and kidnaps Alex Kidd's new girlfriend, while the pair are on a leisurely trip to the planet Shinobi. Powerless to stop the villain, Alex collapses into a sobbing heap, but is found by the ghost of the ancient warrior who originally vanquished the Dark Ninja; who explains that Hanzo intends to sacrifice Alex's girlfriend as part of a ritual to conquer the world. The spirit of the ancient warrior fuses itself with Alex's body; lending Alex his strength, skills, and courage; and with their combined power, they set out to save Alex's girlfriend and vanquish the Dark Ninja once and for all.

The game is composed of four different rounds roughly based on the missions from the original Shinobi, which are divided into three stages. The third stage in each round is a boss battle.  The rounds are as follows.

Round 1 - Set in a city. The boss is "Kabuto" (a parody of Ken-oh and originally Mario), a warrior in samurai armor who throws fireballs and shrinks into a smaller size after sustaining damage.
Round 2 - Set in a harbor. The boss is a fleet of tiny helicopters spitted by a robotic face (a parody of both the Black Turtle attack chopper and the Mandara Master).
Round 3 - Set in a bamboo garden. The boss is "Robster" (a parody of the Lobster), who is an actual lobster.
Round 4 - Set in a mansion. The boss is Hanzo, who fights using several attack patterns similar to the Masked Ninja in the original Shinobi.

Development 

In 2007, images and articles began to surface on the internet, that like Alex Kidd: High-Tech World, Alex Kidd was not originally intended to be the star of the game. Rather, the game was initially devised to be a 'cute' parody of Shinobi, in a similar vein to Kid Dracula was to Castlevania, Parodius was to Gradius and Star Parodier was to Star Soldier.

The boss of Round 1, called Kabuto in the released version of the game, also had a different design in the prototype. He was originally named "Mari-Oh" and was designed as a pastiche of Mario, the mascot of rival game developer Nintendo. The character behaved like a combination of Mario and the Shinobi villain Ken-Oh, hence the name. Mari-Oh shares two qualities with his Nintendo namesake: he attacks the player by shooting bouncing fireballs and after sustaining enough damage, he shrinks to a smaller size. Although Mari-Oh was renamed Kabuto in the finished, with a redesign that downplayed his likeness to Mario, his attack pattern remained unchanged from the prototype.

Reception

Alex Kidd in Shinobi World was critically acclaimed upon release. Computer and Video Games magazine gave the game a score of 92% in its September 1990 issue. The reviewer Robert Swan stated that the "game is brill! A combination of Alex Kidd in Miracle World and Shinobi" that "works really well." He praised the playability that "becomes progressively more difficult as you go along," and concluded that it is a "great game" overall. In 1991, Computer and Video Games described the game as "probably the best in the Alex series so far" and "a hilarious mixture of Alex Kidd and Shinobi." Sega Pro magazine gave the game a score of 88% in its inaugural November 1991 issue, describing it as a "huge game" with "so much to do that addiction is guaranteed."

Retrospectively, Allgame gave a rating of 3.5 out of 5 stars, praising the game for being a successful combination of both Shinobi and the Alex Kidd games, including the game characters and game music from Shinobi while retaining the platforming style from Alex Kidd, although giving criticism to the gameplay especially boss attack patterns and jumps being obvious and too easy for older experienced players.

References

External links

1990 video games
Alex Kidd games
Crossover video games
Video games about ninja
Parody video games
Platform games
Sega video games
Master System games
Shinobi (series)
Virtual Console games
Ninja parody
Video games developed in Japan